Grevillea pilosa is a species of flowering plant in the family Proteaceae and is endemic to the south-west of Western Australia. It is a spreading to prostrate shrub with wedge-shaped to oblong leaves with sharply pointed, more or less triangular teeth or lobes, and clusters of pale pink to rose-pink or red flowers.

Description
The edges of the leaves are turned down, the lower surface covered with silky hairs.

Taxonomy
This grevillea was first formally described in 1942 by Charles Gardner who gave it the name Grevillea rufa in the Journal of the Royal Society of Western Australia but the name was illegitimate because it had been used for a different species (Grevillea rufa  (Warb.) Sleumer), now known as Finschia rufa.

In 1965, Alex George changed the name to Grevillea pilosa in the Western Australian Naturalist. The specific epithet (pilosa) means "hairy", referring to the flowers.

In 1994, Peter Olde and Neil Marriott described G. pilosa subsp. redacta and the name, and that or the autonym are accepted by the Australian Plant Census:

Distribution and habitat
This grevillea grows in mallee shrubland or heath, subspecies pilosa between Newdegate, Mount Holland and Ravensthorpe in the Coolgardie, Esperance Plains and Mallee bioregions and subsp. redacta further north, in a small area just north of Lake Cronin to north of Mount Holland in the Coolgardie and Mallee bioregions of south-western Western Australia.

Conservation status
Subspecies pilosa is listed as "not threatened"but subsp. redacta is listed as  "Priority Three" by the Government of Western Australia Department of Biodiversity, Conservation and Attractions, meaning that it is poorly known and known from only a few locations but is not under imminent threat.

References

pilosa
Eudicots of Western Australia
Proteales of Australia
Taxa named by Charles Gardner
Plants described in 1942